Crime and Punishment is a 1998 American made-for-television drama film directed by Joseph Sargent and based on the 1866 novel by Fyodor Dostoyevsky. It stars Patrick Dempsey and Ben Kingsley.

Cast
Patrick Dempsey as Rodya Raskolnikov 
Ben Kingsley as Porfiry
Julie Delpy as Sonia Marmeladova
Eddie Marsan as Dimitri
Lili Horváth as Dounia

Production
Filming took place in Budapest, Hungary.

References

External links

1998 television films
1998 films
1990s English-language films
1998 drama films
NBC network original films
Films directed by Joseph Sargent
Films based on Crime and Punishment
American drama television films
1990s American films